A list of manga published by Hakusensha, listed by the year they were first released. For an alphabetical list, see :Category:Hakusensha manga.

1970s

1971
Shiroi Heya no Futari

1975
Natsu e no Tobira

1976
Glass Mask
Sukeban Deka

1978
Patalliro!
The Star of Cottonland

1979
Chizumi & Fujiomi

1980s

1980
Hi Izuru Tokoro no Tenshi

1981
Blue Sonnet

1984
Cipher

1985
Outlanders
Sakura no Sono

1986
Dominion

1987
Hanasakeru Seishōnen
Here Is Greenwood
Please Save My Earth

1989
Berserk
Moon Child

1990s

1991
Baby and Me
Earl Cain

1992
Eight Clouds Rising
Japan
Legend of Chun Hyang

1993
From Far Away
I Dream of Mimi
Jyu-Oh-Sei
Onmyōji
Songs to Make You Smile

1994
Angel Sanctuary
Kaguyahime
Phantom Dream

1995
Challengers
Tower of the Future
Tsubasa: Those with Wings

1996
Descendants of Darkness
Hana-Kimi
Kare Kano
Okojo-san
Tokyo Crazy Paradise

1997
Air Master
Futari Ecchi
W Juliet

1998
Ai Yori Aoshi
Boy's Next Door
Fruits Basket
I Hate You More than Anyone
Land of the Blindfolded
Solfege

1999
Ai-Ren
Captive Hearts
Harukanaru Toki no Naka de
Ludwig Kakumei
Mouse
Never Give Up!
Omukae desu
Satisfaction Guaranteed
Venus in Love

2000s

2000
Portrait of M and N

2001
Gatcha Gacha
Global Garden
Godchild
Fun Fun Factory
Hana Yori mo Hana no Gotoku
Himitsu – Top Secret
King of Cards
Millennium Snow
The Recipe for Gertrude
Soul Rescue
Tears of a Lamb

2002
Futari Ecchi For Ladies
Hotarubi no Mori e
MeruPuri
Ouran High School Host Club
Pearl Pink
Skip Beat!

2003
All My Darling Daughters
Beauty is the Beast
Blood Hound
Chocotto Sister
Demon Sacred
Gakuen Alice
Nosatsu Junkie
Nurse Witch Komugi
Patalliro Saiyuki!
S · A: Special A
Yubisaki Milk Tea
Yurara

2004
Bloody Kiss
Cute×Guy
Full House Kiss
The Magic Touch
Me & My Brothers
Meine Liebe
Mugen Spiral
Patalliro Genji Monogatari!
This Ugly Yet Beautiful World
Two Flowers for the Dragon
V.B. Rose
Vampire Knight
Wild Ones
Zig Zag

2005
Ballad of a Shinigami
Blank Slate
Boku wo Tsutsumu Tsuki no Hikari
Concerto
Detroit Metal City
Fairy Cube
Happy Cafe
Karakuri Odette
Maid Sama!
Mouse Bakumatsu-den
Natsume's Book of Friends
NG Life
Ōoku: The Inner Chambers
Otogimoyou Ayanishiki
Penguin Revolution
Sugar Princess
Wanted

2006
Akagami no Shirayukihime
Cluster Edge
Flower in a Storm
Himawari-den!
KimiKiss: Various heroines
Otomen
Rasetsu no Hana
Venus Capriccio
W Juliet II
Yuria 100 Shiki

2007
Eensy Weensy Monster
Faster than a Kiss
Hana to Akuma
Hoshi wa Utau
March Comes in Like a Lion
Oresama Teacher
Shitsuji-sama no Okiniiri
Soko o Nantoka
Library Wars: Love & War
Zettai Heiwa Daisakusen

2008
Chotto Edo Made
Gou-dere Sora Nagihara
Grand Guignol Orchestra
Kamisama Kiss
Nana to Kaoru
Palette of 12 Secret Colors
The Secret Notes of Lady Kanoko

2009
Akatsuki no Yona
Amagami: Precious Diary
Apocrypha Getter Robo Darkness
Jiu Jiu
Koi Dano Ai Dano
Usotsuki Paradox
Voice Over! Seiyu Academy

2010s

2010
Amagami: Precious Diary - Kaoru
Sickness Unto Death
Tokyo Yamimushi

2011
Hotarubi no Mori e Tokubetsuhen
Liselotte and Witch's Forest
Last Game
Nana to Kaoru Black Label
Nana Kao Pink Pure
Onmyōji: Tamatebako
Photo Kano: Your Eyes Only

2012
The World Is Still Beautiful

2013
Ludwig Fantasy: Princess Kaguya
Tokyo Yamimushi -2nd Scenario- Pandora

2014
Shinmai Maō no Testament: Arashi!
Takane and Hana

2017
Prince Freya

2020s

2021
Tamon's B-Side

References

Hakusensha
 
Hakusensha